Claude, chevalier, then count de Forbin-Gardanne (6 August 1656 – 4 March 1733) was a French naval commander. In 1685–1688 he was on a diplomatic mission to Siam. He became governor of Bangkok and a general in the Siamese army, and left Siam shortly before King Narai fell ill and was deposed by a coup d'état.

Biography
Claude de Forbin was born in the village Gardanne in the Provence, as a member of a family established in Marseilles in the 14th century. Later divided into several branches, Claude de Forbin was the most famous of the branch Forbin Gardanne.

High-spirited and ungovernable in his boyhood, he ran away from his home, and through the influence of an uncle entered the navy, serving his first campaign in 1675. For a short time he quit the navy and entered the musketeers. There, he killed the chevalier de Gourdon in a duel, and was sentenced to death by the Parliament of Aix; he managed to obtain a grace and joined the Navy under his brother's identity.

He served under the Count d'Estrées during the American campaign, and under Duquesne that of Algiers in 1683, on all occasions distinguishing himself by his impetuous courage.

Grand Admiral of Siam

The most remarkable episode of his life was his mission to Siam. During the administration of the Greek adventurer Phaulcon in that country, the project was formed of introducing the Christian religion and European civilisation, and the king sent an embassy to Louis XIV. In response a French embassy was sent out, Forbin accompanying the Chevalier de Chaumont with the rank of major aboard the Oiseau. When Chaumont returned to France, Forbin was induced to remain in the service of the Siamese king, and accepted, though with much reluctance, the posts of grand admiral, general of all the king's armies and governor of Bangkok. During his tenure he crushed the Makassar Revolt at Bangkok, although almost at the cost of his own life.

His position, however, was soon made untenable by the jealousy and intrigues of the minister Phaulcon; and at the end of two years he left Siam, reaching France in 1688. He was replaced as Governor of Bangkok by the Chevalier de Beauregard.

War with England
Claude de Forbin was afterwards fully engaged in active service, first with Jean Bart in the war with England, when they escorted a convoy; attacked by superior forces, Forbin, aboard the Jeux, and Jean Bart, aboard the Railleuse, sacrificed themselves in a delaying action to allow the convoy the escape. They were both captured and taken to Plymouth. They succeeded in making their escape after 11 days, crossed the Channel on a small craft, and were soon serving their country again.

Made a capitaine de vaisseau in June 1689, he commanded the Neptune in the Battle of Beachy Head (1690). After a campaign in the North Sea in 1691, he commanded the Perle in Barfleur, where he was wounded. He greatly distinguished himself at the battle of Lagos in 1693. Commanding the Marquis in 1695, he campaigned in the Mediterranean and Constantinople. In 1697, he served in Catalonia in the siege of Barcelona.

During the War of the Spanish Succession, he led a three-ship of the line division in the Adriatic, where he blockaded Venice, bombed Trieste and ramsonned Fiume. In 1703 and 1704, he hunted down the privateers from Vlissingen.

In June 1706, he attacked an English convoy, capturing seven ships; on 12 July, he seized two Dutch ships, and on 28 October, engaging a strongly escorted Dutch convoy, he captured three ships and sank another one.

In 1707, he was made a Chef d'Escadre (Rear-Admiral). On 12 May he captured a British convoy of 18 ships en route for Portugal. In the summer he led the Mars and a division into the White Sea, returning to Brest on 23 September with 34 captured ships.

On 21 October in the Battle at the Lizard, he helped Duguay-Trouin in destroying almost entirely an English convoy set for Portugal: of 80 ships, 60 merchantman and four ships of the line were captured, and 1 other was sunk.

In 1708, he led Prince James Francis Edward Stuart to Scotland, in an attempt to reconquer the Throne of England; ill-prepared, the attempt failed, and Forbin ceased to navigate.  He quit the Navy in January 1715, and died on 4 March 1733 in Saint-Marcel Castle near Marseille.

His Memories were published in 1730, written by his secretary.

Sometimes hated for his harsh and strong personality, Forbin entered the legend as one of the most brilliant sailors of the time.

Trivia 
Six vessels of the French Navy bore the name (see French ship Forbin).

See also
France-Thailand relations

Notes

References

 

Attribution

External links

 memoires-de-siam (in French)
 www.netmarine.net (in French)

Claude de Forbin
Expatriates in the Ayutthaya Kingdom
Forbin, Claude de
Forbin, Claude de
Forbin, Claude de
Forbin, Claude de
Forbin, Claude de